Antonio de Valdivieso (born 1495 died 26 Feb 1549) was a Roman Catholic prelate who served as Bishop of Nicaragua (1544–1549).

Biography
Antonio de Valdivieso was ordained a priest in the Order of Preachers. On 29 Feb 1544, he was appointed during the papacy of Pope Paul III as Bishop of Nicaragua. On 8 Nov 1544, he was consecrated bishop by Bartolomé de las Casas, with Francisco Marroquín Hurtado, Bishop of Santiago de Guatemala, and Cristóbal de Pedraza, Bishop of Comayagua, serving as co-consecrators. As he was very concerned for the wellbeing of the Indians and the abuses practiced under the encomienda system, he attracted the ire of the governor, who libeled his character in Granada.> Hernando de Contreras, the son of the governor, roused an angry mob, went to Valdivieso's home, and subsequently stabbed the Valdivieso to death on 26 Feb 1549.

References

External links and additional sources
 (for Chronology of Bishops) 
 (for Chronology of Bishops) 

16th-century Roman Catholic bishops in Nicaragua
1549 deaths
Bishops appointed by Pope Paul III
Dominican bishops
Servants of God
Roman Catholic bishops of León in Nicaragua